Murat Pasha may refer to the following Ottoman statesmen:

Seytan Murat Pasha (d. 1570), variously governor of Damascus, Shahrazor, Basra and Lahsa, also known as Kara Murat Pasha.
Kuyucu Murat Pasha, grand vizier in 1605–1611
Kara Murat Pasha, grand vizier in 1649–1650, and shortly in 1655

See also 
 Muratpaşa, a district of Antalya Province, Turkey
 Muratpaşa Belediyesi Spor Kulübü, a sports club based there
 Murat Paşa Mosque, a mosque in Antalya
 Murat (name)